Deloryctis is a monotypic moth genus in the family Depressariidae. Its only species,  Deloryctis corticivora, is found on Java in Indonesia. Both the genus and species were first described by Edward Meyrick in 1934.

References

Moths described in 1934
Depressariinae
Monotypic moth genera